The 2022 Western Kentucky Hilltoppers football team represented Western Kentucky University as a member of Conference USA (C-USA) during the 2022 NCAA Division I FBS football season. They were led by head coach Tyson Helton, who was coaching his fourth season with the team. The Hilltoppers played their home games at Houchens Industries–L. T. Smith Stadium in Bowling Green, Kentucky.

The team was led on offense by quarterback Austin Reed who joined the team in 2022 via the NCAA transfer portal. Through the first two games, Reed had 550 passing yards, ranking third in the nation.

Previous season
The 2021 team finished the regular season with a record of 9–4. The team went 7–1 in Conference USA play, finishing in first place in the East Division; Western Kentucky's lone conference loss was against UTSA. The Hilltoppers made the Conference USA Championship Game in a rematch against UTSA; the Hilltoppers would lose 41–49. Western Kentucky accepted an invitation to the Boca Raton Bowl, defeating Appalachian State 59–38 to finish the season with an overall record of 9–5.

Preseason

C-USA media day
The Conference USA media day was held on July 27 at Globe Life Field in Arlington, Texas. The Hilltoppers were represented by head coach Tyson Helton, tight end Joey Beljan, and defensive end Juwuan Jones. The Hilltoppers were predicted to finish third in the conference's preseason poll.

Roster

Schedule
Western Kentucky and Conference USA announced the 2022 football schedule on March 30, 2022.

Game summaries

Austin Peay

at Hawaii

at Indiana

FIU

Troy

at UTSA

at Middle Tennessee

UAB

North Texas

at Charlotte

Rice

at Auburn

at Florida Atlantic

South Alabama (New Orleans Bowl)

References

Western Kentucky
Western Kentucky Hilltoppers football seasons
New Orleans Bowl champion seasons
Western Kentucky Hilltoppers football